Five-string guitar or five-string may refer to:

Plucked
 Baroque guitar, c. 1600–1750
  bass guitar, with five strings (also often with four or six strings)
 extended-range electric bass guitar, with five strings (also often with six or occasionally more strings)
 five-string banjo (also often with four or six strings)
 six-string guitar with one string removed, often the low "E", and retuned
 vihuela, from Spain, Portugal, or Italy c. 1450-1550 (also often with six courses of strings)
 Mexican vihuela, c. 1800-present, often played in mariachi groups

Bowed
 a five string violin, a modern version of a violin with an extra string (six and seven string electric violins also exist)

See also 
 Guitar (disambiguation)